Jerome High School may refer to:

Jerome High School (Dublin, Ohio)
Jerome High School (Jerome, Idaho)
Jerome High School (Jerome, Arizona)